The Ramadan Offensive was a series of insurgent attacks against Coalition and Iraqi military targets from the end of October and during much of November 2003.

The attacks are called the Ramadan Offensive because they were conducted during the Muslim holy month of Ramadan. The number of insurgent attacks increased during this period mainly because of the belief among the insurgent forces that fighting a foreign occupation force during Islam's holy month puts a believer especially close to God.

The Offensive

Offensive starts and the al-Rashid Hotel attack
On the morning of October 26, 2003, the first day of Ramadan, suicide bombers drove 5 carloads of explosives into 5 buildings, the  headquarters of the International Committee of the Red Cross and four Iraqi police stations, as the insurgent offensive began. That morning in the early hours in Baghdad insurgents fired an improvised multiple-tube launcher mounted in a trailer that was made up to look like a mobile generator, about 400 meters from the al-Rashid Hotel. Where, at the time, U.S. Deputy Defense Secretary Paul Wolfowitz was staying. Eight to ten rockets hit the hotel killing one U.S. soldier and wounding 15 people, including seven American civilians and four soldiers. Several more rockets were fired but missed their target. Wolfowitz was on the 12th floor of the hotel, which houses U.S. and coalition officials in Baghdad, and on the side of the hotel that came under attack. The rockets reached only as high as the 11th floor.

Baghdad bombings

At the start of the offensive on October 27, 2003 insurgents staged a coordinated suicide attack targeting the Red Cross compound, and four Iraqi police stations in Baghdad. The bombings all occurred within about 45 minutes of each other. Four suicide bombers died but the fifth, a Syrian, who attempted to blow up the fourth police station failed after the man's car apparently failed to explode. He was shot and wounded by the Iraqi police and arrested. The attacks killed 35 people, as well as injuring 244. Among the dead were also 2 U.S. soldiers.

Italian military police headquarters destroyed

On November 12, 2003 a suicide bomber in a tanker truck attacked the Italian military police headquarters in Nasiriyah destroying it and killing 28 people, including 17 Italian soldiers and 2 Italian civilians.

The attack was the worst incident involving Italian soldiers since Operation Restore Hope in Somalia and the highest loss of Italian soldiers since World War II. The attack thus shocked Italy and plunged it into a three-day mourning period. The soldiers were given a state funeral.

Helicopter downings

During this time, a number of U.S. military helicopters were shot down resulting in a large number of casualties inflicted on the U.S. forces. Three UH-60 Black Hawks and one CH-47D Chinook were downed, killing 39 soldiers and wounding 31. Two of the helicopters were downed using Strela missile launchers that most likely ended up in the hands of the insurgents via the black market.

A day before the start of the offensive, on 25 October 2003 another UH-60 Black Hawk was shot down, wounding 5 soldiers.

Aftermath
Many people compared the Ramadan Offensive with the Tet Offensive of 1968 in the Vietnam war. Some also said that the similarities to Tet were chilling. In 1968, the attacks came at the onset of the Vietnamese New Year, a holiday that American command believed would herald a temporary quieting of the violence. In Iraq, these attacks came at the beginning of the Muslim holy month of Ramadan. The American command in Baghdad believed the holiday would bring a slacking of the attacks that had been plaguing American forces. This assumption ran so strong that the Baghdad curfew was partially lifted by American forces. The most pointed similarity was clear: These attacks were meant to cause a political reaction.

References

Battles of the Iraq War in 2003
Iraqi insurgency (2003–2011)
Ramadan
October 2003 events in Asia
November 2003 events in Asia